Operation Cottage was a tactical maneuver which completed the Aleutian Islands campaign. On August 15, 1943, Allied military forces landed on Kiska Island, which had been occupied by Japanese forces since June 1942. The Japanese, however, had secretly abandoned the island two weeks earlier, and so the Allied landings were unopposed. Allied forces suffered over 313 casualties in total during the operation, due to Japanese landmines and booby traps, friendly fire incidents, and vehicle accidents.

Background

The Japanese under Captain Takeji Ono had landed on Kiska at approximately 01:00 on June 6, 1942, with a force of about 500 Japanese marines. Soon after arrival, they stormed an American weather station, where they killed two and captured eight United States Navy officers. The captured officers were sent to Japan as prisoners of war. Another 2,000 Japanese troops arrived, landing in Kiska Harbor. At this time, Rear-Admiral Monzo Akiyama headed the force on Kiska. In December 1942, additional anti-aircraft units, engineers, and a negligible number of reinforcement infantry arrived on the island. In the spring of 1943, control was transferred to Kiichiro Higuchi.

Invasion plan and execution

After the heavy casualties suffered at Attu Island, planners were expecting another costly operation. The Japanese tactical planners had, however, realized the isolated island was no longer defensible and planned for an evacuation.

Starting in late July, there were increasing signs of Japanese withdrawal. Aerial photograph analysts noticed that routine activities appeared to greatly diminish and almost no movement could be detected in the harbor. Bomb damage appeared unrepaired and aircrews reported greatly diminished anti-aircraft fire. On July 28, radio signals from Kiska ceased entirely.

On August 15, 1943, the U.S. 7th Infantry Division, 87th Mountain Infantry Regiment of the 10th Mountain Division and the 13th Canadian Infantry Brigade from the 6th Canadian Infantry Division, landed on opposite shores of Kiska. Canadian regiments landed included the Canadian Fusiliers (City of London Regiment); the Winnipeg Grenadiers; the Rocky Mountain Rangers; and the Saint John Fusiliers. The invasion also involved the first combat deployment of the First Special Service Force, an elite special forces unit consisting of American and Canadian commandos.

Both U.S. and Canadian forces mistook each other, after a Canadian soldier shot at U.S. lines believing they were Japanese, and a sporadic friendly fire incident occurred, which left 28 Americans and 4 Canadians dead, with 50 wounded on either side. Progress was also hampered by mines, timed bombs, accidental ammunition detonations, vehicle accidents and booby traps. The blast killed 71 and wounded 47.

Gallery

See also
Operation Chronicle, a similar amphibious assault on an abandoned island
Yank Levy, who trained many of these forces in guerrilla warfare
Friendly fire incidents of World War II

Notes

References

Garfield, Brian The Thousand Mile War, Aurum Press, 1995

External links

Logistics Problems on Attu by Robert E. Burks.
Operation Cottage at canadiansoldiers.com
Aleutian Islands Chronology
Aleutian Islands War
Red White Black & Blue - feature documentary about The Battle of Attu in the Aleutians during World War II
Soldiers of the 184th Infantry, 7th ID in the Pacific, 1943-1945
World War II Aleutian Islands: The U.S. Army Campaigns of World War II  from the United States Army Center of Military History.

Aleutian Islands campaign
American Theater of World War II
Pacific Ocean theatre of World War II
Battles involving the United States
Battles of World War II involving the United States
Battles of World War II involving Canada
Friendly fire incidents of World War II
Amphibious operations of World War II
August 1943 events
Amphibious operations involving the United States
Amphibious operations involving Canada